No God, No Master is a 2012 American independent crime suspense thriller directed, written, and produced by Terry Green.  The film stars David Strathairn, Ray Wise, Sam Witwer, Alessandro Mario and Edoardo Ballerini. No God, No Master was filmed in Milwaukee, Wisconsin. The story includes references to the 1914 Ludlow Massacre as well as depictions of the Sacco and Vanzetti trial and the 1920 Wall Street bombing.

The film premiered at the 2012 Milwaukee Film Festival.

Plot
In the spring of 1919 a series of package bombs begin to show up on the doorsteps of prominent politicians and businessmen. U.S. Bureau of Investigation Agent William Flynn (Strathairn) is assigned the task of finding those responsible and becomes immersed in an investigation that uncovers an anarchist plot. The film is based on true events.

Cast
 David Strathairn as William J. Flynn
 Sam Witwer as Eugenio Ravarini
 Edoardo Ballerini as Carlo Tresca
 Alessandro Mario as Bartolomeo Vanzetti
 Ray Wise as Attorney General Mitchell Palmer
 Jeff DuJardin as Reporter Tom Benton

Production

Development
No God, No Master is directed, written, and produced by Terry Green.

Filming
No God, No Master was filmed in Milwaukee, Wisconsin, USA in 2009 over 24 days at 42 different locations, including Villa Terrace, South Shore Park Pavilion, City Hall and the old Pabst Brewery.

Release
In October 2013, Monterey Media bought the United States distribution rights for release of the film in the United States and Canada in March 2014.

Festivals
No God, No Master was selected to screen at the 2012 Stony Brook Film Festival.

Reception
 the film holds a 73% rating on Rotten Tomatoes, based on 15 reviews.

References

External links
 
 
 

2012 films
American independent films
Films set in 1919
Films about anarchism
Political films based on actual events
Films shot in Wisconsin
Films about terrorism in the United States
2010s English-language films
Works about Sacco and Vanzetti
2010s American films